The men's 200 metre butterfly competition of the swimming events at the 1991 Pan American Games took place on 17 August. The last Pan American Games champion was Bill Stapleton of US.

This race consisted of four lengths of the pool, all lengths being in butterfly stroke.

Results
All times are in minutes and seconds.

Heats

Final 
The final was held on August 17.

References

Swimming at the 1991 Pan American Games